Kręgi Nowe  is a village in the administrative district of Gmina Wyszków, within Wyszków County, Masovian Voivodeship, in east-central Poland.

The village has a population of 190.

References

Villages in Wyszków County